This was the first edition of the tournament.

Altuğ Çelikbilek and Dmitry Popko won the title after defeating Daniel Cukierman and Emilio Gómez 6–7(4–7), 6–4, [10–6] in the final.

Seeds

Draw

References

External links
 Main draw

Málaga Open - Doubles